The Texas Longhorns women's basketball program is a college basketball team that represents the University of Texas in the Big 12 Conference in the National Collegiate Athletic Association. The team has seen 5 individuals hold the head coach position since its inception in 1974. The current head coach is Vic Schaefer, who led his first season in 2020.

Over the history of the Texas basketball program, only 1 coach has been enshrined in the Naismith Memorial Basketball Hall of Fame. The all-time wins leader is Jody Conradt, having won 783 games over her 31-year tenure at the University of Texas.

Key

Bold= Leader in each category

Coaches

Notes

References

Texas Longhorns basketball coaches, women's
Texas Longhorns